Bolbe pygmaea is a species of praying mantis in the family Nanomantidae. It is endemic to Australia.

Description
At approximately 1 cm in length when fully grown, Bolbe pygmea is the smallest species of praying mantis in the world.

See also
List of Australian stick insects and mantids
Mantodea of Oceania
List of mantis genera and species

References

pygmaea
Mantodea of Oceania
Insects of Australia
Endemic flora of Australia
Insects described in 1871